Oscar Morales may refer to:

 Óscar Javier Morales (born 1975), Uruguayan football defensive midfielder
 Oscar Morales (footballer, born 1986), Honduran football defender